Pine Grove is an unincorporated community in Bienville Parish, Louisiana, United States.

References

Unincorporated communities in Bienville Parish, Louisiana
Unincorporated communities in Louisiana